Kalathil Makki Divakaran, also known by his pen name Chandiroor Divakaran, is a Malayalam–language poet and folk-song writer from Kerala, India. He was awarded the Ambedkar National Award in 2011 for his overall contribution to Malayalam literature.

Works

 Radha – (1965)
 Parnnupoya Inakkuyil – (1966)
 Malsyaghandhi – (1968)
 Sheriffa – (1969)
 Udayavum Kathu – (1977)
 Aazhathilodungiya Jeevithangal – (1980)
 Madhya Durantham – (1982)
 Kudumbini – (1990) (Short story)
 Muzhakkuka Panjajanyam – (1991)
 Chakara – (1994) (Children's poetry)
 Pakal pakshiyude geetham – (1996)
 Desapuranam – (1996) (Children's poetry)
 Arani – (1999)
 Pattini Theyyam – (2003)
 Ulsavam – (2003) (Children's poetry)
 Vishadhaparvam – (2004)
 Viswakarmakeerthanangal – (2007)
 Iniyethradhooram – (2008)
 Mounanombaram – (2011)
 Karnikaram – (2013)

Awards

 Poppal Gana Award – (1976)
 Jnanodhayam Sabha P.K.M Vayanasala Award – (1977)
 DYFI Award – (Palluruthy Zone, 1978) 
 Chethana Award – (1979)
 Mathrubhumi Award – (Thrissur District, 1981)
 Samastha Kerala Sahithya Parishath Award - (1985)
 Yuvabhushanam Vayanasala Award – (1987)
 Ujala Award – (1994)
 Surendran Memorial Award – (1994) – Vishadha
 Padit Karuppan Sahithya Award – (1994)
 Bodhi Sahithya Puraskaram – (2003)
 Jusse Award – (2005)
 Krishna Award – (2008)
 P.K. Thevar Award – (2009)
 Akshyadeepapuraskaram – (2010)
 Ambedkar Award – (2011)

References 

1946 births
Indian male poets
Indian male composers
People from Alappuzha district
Writers from Kerala
Malayalam-language writers
Living people
Musicians from Kerala
Malayalam poets
20th-century Indian poets
20th-century Indian musicians
21st-century Indian poets
Indian children's writers
Indian folk musicians
20th-century Indian male writers
21st-century Indian male writers
20th-century male musicians